Flow States is an album by reed players Marshall Allen, Roscoe Mitchell, and Scott Robinson, and drummer Milford Graves. It was recorded at ScienSonic Laboratories in Teaneck, New Jersey on April 21, 2015, and was released in 2020 by the ScienSonic label. The album captured the first occasion on which Mitchell played with either Allen or Graves. It was recorded one day after the ScienSonic session that produced the album Heliosonic Toneways, on which both Allen and Robinson performed.

Reception

In a review for DownBeat, Ivana Ng called the album "a compact yet unrelenting set of expansive improvisations," and commented: "Flow States finds the quartet oscillating
between forceful explorations and sparse, meditative musings, while seamlessly weaving in bebop, funk and more avant-garde concepts... The band's collaboration throughout feels organic and well-balanced, with each musician afforded the proper space to explore fringe concepts... By its conclusion, the band reaches a full-on flow state of boundless improvisation and unbridled creative energy"

Writing for The New York City Jazz Record, Kyle Oleksiuk described the album as "strong" and "adventurous," and depicted the bulk of the music as "a high-energy free
jazz atmospheric fugue (in the 'fugue state' sense), worthy of addition to the browsing music of any adventurous record store." He concluded: "This section is relatively standard; it is the kind of thing that most free jazz fans will feel they've heard a thousand times before but, like the blues, one never gets tired of hearing it."

Track listing

 "Vortex State" – 15:16
 "Dream State" – 10:47
 "Transition State" – 7:55
 "Steady State" – 5:53
 "Plasma State" – 6:23
 "Altered State" – 6:18
 "Variable State" – 6:12
 "Flow State" – 9:40

Personnel 
 Marshall Allen – reeds
 Roscoe Mitchell – reeds
 Scott Robinson – reeds
 Milford Graves – drums

References

2020 albums
Roscoe Mitchell albums
Milford Graves albums
Marshall Allen albums